Henri-Franck Beaupérin (born 1968 in Nantes) is a French organist and improviser.

Life 
After being one of the last disciples of Gaston Litaize, Beaupérin studied with Michel Chapuis, Olivier Latry, Michel Bouvard, Loïc Mallié and Jean-Claude Raynaud at the Conservatoire de Paris, and completed his training with masters such as Jean Boyer, Louis Robilliard, Thierry Escaich, Ton Koopman and Jean Guillou.

Winner of the Tokyo and Lahti international competitions, Improvisation Prize at the Franz Liszt Competition in Budapest, he was revealed to the public in 1995 when he unanimously received the Grand Prix of interpretation of the first International Competition of the City of Paris.

Emeritus organist of the Cathedral of Angers, he leads an important musical development activity in this region: creation of the Academy of Improvisation at the Pays de la Loire Organ, the Organ Association in Pays de la Loire, the International Competition of Ancient Music in the Loire Valley.

A leading performer of the symphonic repertoire and a sought-after improviser, he published the first edition of Raphaël Fumet's organ work  (Delatour editions) and made many transcriptions for organ, including Franck's Prélude, Choral et Fugue and Jean-Louis Florentz' L’Anneau de Salomon.

References

External links 
 Récital d'orgue by Henri-Franck Beaupérin (Notre-Dame de Paris)
 Les Grandes Orgues de la Cathédrale d'Angers by Henri-Franck Beaupérin  
 Angers : l'organiste licencié pourra rejouer à la cathédrale (France 3)
 Chaîne YouTube dédiée

1968 births
Living people
Musicians from Nantes
Conservatoire de Paris alumni
French classical organists
French male organists
20th-century organists
21st-century organists
20th-century French male musicians
21st-century French male musicians
Male classical organists